In mathematics, the Moyal product (after José Enrique Moyal; also called the star product or Weyl–Groenewold product, after Hermann Weyl and Hilbrand J. Groenewold) is an example of a phase-space star product.  It is an associative, non-commutative product, ★,   on the functions on ℝ2n,  equipped with its Poisson bracket (with a generalization to symplectic manifolds, described below).  It is a special case of the ★-product of the "algebra of symbols" of a universal enveloping algebra.

Historical comments
The Moyal product is named after José Enrique Moyal, but is also sometimes called the Weyl–Groenewold product as it was introduced by H. J. Groenewold in his 1946 doctoral dissertation, in a trenchant appreciation of the Weyl correspondence.  Moyal actually appears not to know about the product in his celebrated article and was crucially lacking it in his legendary correspondence with Dirac, as illustrated in his biography. The popular naming after Moyal appears to have emerged only in the 1970s, in homage to his flat phase-space quantization picture.

Definition

where each Cn is a certain bidifferential operator of order  characterized by the following properties (see below for an explicit formula):
 
Deformation of the pointwise product — implicit in the formula above.
 
Deformation of the Poisson bracket, called Moyal bracket.
 
The 1 of the undeformed algebra is also the identity in the new algebra.
 
 The complex conjugate is an antilinear antiautomorphism.

If one restricts to polynomial functions, the above algebra is isomorphic to the Weyl algebra An, and the two offer alternative realizations of the Weyl map of the space of polynomials in  variables (or the symmetric algebra of a vector space of dimension 2 ).

To provide an explicit formula, consider a constant Poisson bivector   on ℝ2n:

where Πij is a  real number for each i, j. 
The star product of two functions    and     can then be defined as the  pseudo-differential operator acting on both of them,

where  is the reduced Planck constant, treated as a formal parameter here. 

This is a special case of what is known as the Berezin formula on the algebra of symbols and can be given a closed form (which follows from the Baker–Campbell–Hausdorff formula). The closed form can be obtained by using the exponential:

where     is the multiplication map, and the exponential is treated as a power series,

The relationship of the Moyal product to the generalized ★-product used in the definition of the "algebra of symbols" of a universal enveloping algebra follows from the fact that the Weyl algebra is the universal enveloping algebra of the Heisenberg algebra (modulo that the center equals the unit).

On manifolds
On any symplectic manifold, one can, at least locally, choose coordinates so as to make the symplectic structure constant, by Darboux's theorem; and, using the associated Poisson bivector, one may consider the above formula.  For it to work globally,
as a function on the whole manifold (and not just a local formula), one must equip the symplectic manifold with a torsion-free symplectic connection. This makes it a Fedosov manifold.

More general results for arbitrary Poisson manifolds (where the Darboux theorem does not apply) are given by the Kontsevich quantization formula.

Examples
A simple explicit example of the construction and utility of the ★-product (for the simplest case of a two-dimensional euclidean phase space) is given in the article on the Wigner–Weyl transform: two Gaussians compose with this ★-product according to a hyperbolic tangent law:
 

(Note the classical limit, .)

Every correspondence prescription between phase space and Hilbert space, however, induces its own proper ★-product.

This situation is clearly different from the case where the positions are taken to be real-valued, but does offer insights into the overall algebraic structure of the Heisenberg algebra and its envelope, the Weyl algebra.

Inside phase-space integrals
Inside a phase-space integral, just one star product of the Moyal type may be dropped, resulting in plain multiplication,  as evident by integration by parts, 
 
making the cyclicity of the phase-space trace manifest. 
This is a unique property of the above specific Moyal product, and does not hold for other correspondence rules' star products, such as Husimi's, etc.

References

Mathematical quantization
Mathematical physics